Amnicon Falls State Park is a state park of Wisconsin, United States. The  park is located in South Range, Wisconsin, southeast of the city of Superior. It features a series of waterfalls on the Amnicon River as it flows around a small island and under a historic covered bridge.

Activities and amenities
The falls are divided into Upper and Lower Falls areas, and swimming is allowed at both.

The park's  of trails include paths along both banks of the river and a snowshoeing trail into remoter park areas.

The park has 36 campsites, two walk-in and one accessible to persons with disabilities.

References

External links

 Amnicon Falls State Park Wisconsin Department of Natural Resources

IUCN Category III
Protected areas established in 1961
Protected areas of Douglas County, Wisconsin
Waterfalls of Wisconsin
State parks of Wisconsin
Landforms of Douglas County, Wisconsin
1961 establishments in Wisconsin